Munt Pers is a mountain in the Bernina Range of the Alps, overlooking the Morteratsch Glacier in the Swiss canton of Graubünden. It lies north of Diavolezza, from where a trail leads to its summit.

References

External links

 Munt Pers on Hikr

Bernina Range
Mountains of Graubünden
Mountains of the Alps
Alpine three-thousanders
Mountains of Switzerland
Pontresina